The African Youth Championship 1997 was held in Morocco. It also served as qualification for the 1997 FIFA World Youth Championship.

Qualification

Morocco qualified automatically as hosts.

First round

 28/29 Sep 1996:
            Algeria       0-2 Tunisia
            Mali          3-0 Mauritania
            Burkina Faso  0-0 Guinea
            Ghana         2-0 Senegal
            Nigeria       5-1 Chad
            Sudan         2-0 Kenya
            Benin         0-1 Ivory Coast
            Egypt         5-0 Ethiopia
            Reunion       0-2 Zimbabwe
            South Africa  2-0 Mauritius
            Angola        3-1 Botswana
            Tanzania      w/o Burundi           [Burundi suspended by CAF following a coup d'état]
            Cameroon      w/o Togo              [Togo withdrew]
            Zambia        w/o Malawi            [Malawi withdrew]

 19/20 Oct 1996:
            Tunisia       1-3 Algeria           [agg. 3-3, Algeria on away goals]
            Guinea        1-1 Burkina Faso      [agg. 1-1, Burkina Faso on away goals]
            Senegal       2-3 Ghana             [agg. 2-5]
            Chad          2-1 Nigeria           [agg. 3-6]
            Kenya         1-0 Sudan             [agg. 1-2]
            Ethiopia      5-0 Egypt             [agg. 5-5, penalties 1-2]
            Zimbabwe      5-0 Reunion           [agg. 7-0]
            Mauritius     1-3 South Africa      [agg. 1-5]
            Botswana      1-2 Angola            [agg. 2-5]

Second round

 21/22 Dec 1996:
            Mali          3-2 Algeria
            Nigeria       2-1 Sudan
            Ivory Coast   5-3 Cameroon
            Burkina Faso  1-1 Ghana
            Egypt         2-1 Zimbabwe
            South Africa  3-0 Tanzania
            Zambia        1-0 Angola

  3/5 Jan 1997:
            Algeria        -  Mali              [Mali qualified]
            Sudan          -  Nigeria           [Sudan qualified]
            Cameroon       -  Ivory Coast       [Ivory Coast qualified]
            Ghana          -  Burkina Faso      [Ghana qualified]
            Zimbabwe       -  Egypt             [Egypt qualified]
            Tanzania      0-1 South Africa      [agg. 0-4]
            Angola        0-1 Zambia            [agg. 0-2]

Teams
Last year's finalists Burundi were disqualified in the qualifying tournament. Eight teams entered the tournament:

 
 
 
 
  (host)

Group stage

Group A

Group B

Semifinals

Third place match

Final

Qualification to World Youth Championship
The four best performing teams qualified for the 1997 FIFA World Youth Championship.

References

External links
Results by RSSSF

Africa U-20 Cup of Nations
Youth
1997
1996–97 in Moroccan football
1996–97 in South African soccer
1996–97 in Ghanaian football
1996–97 in Egyptian football
1997 in youth association football